Kim Wozencraft is an American author. She is best known as the author of the novel Rush, which was subsequently adapted into a 1991 feature film directed by Lili Fini Zanuck and starring Jennifer Jason Leigh, Jason Patric, Gregg Allman and Sam Elliott.

Early life
Wozencraft was born in Dallas, Texas and attended Lake Highlands High School.

Career
Her first novel, Rush, is based on her experiences working as an undercover narcotics agent in Texas soon after President Richard Nixon declared a "War on Drugs". Her novel, Notes From the Country Club, grew out of time served in federal prison. Wozencraft co-edited the book Slam, a companion edition to the award-winning 1998 film. She was executive editor at Prison Life magazine, has written for HBO Films, and her work has appeared in The Best American Essays, Texas Monthly, New York Newsday, the Los Angeles Times, and various literary magazines and anthologies.

Education
Wozencraft has received a Master of Fine Arts degree from Columbia University.

Selected works
 Rush (1990) 
 Notes from the Country Club (1993)
 The Catch (1998)
 Slam (1998)
 Wanted (2004)
 The Devil's Backbone (2006)

References

External links
Official website

20th-century American novelists
21st-century American novelists
American women novelists
People from Dallas
Living people
1954 births
20th-century American women writers
21st-century American women writers
Columbia University School of the Arts alumni